Maureen Oldman (born 1 August 1945), known professionally as Laila Morse, is an English actress. Her roles include Janet in the drama film Nil by Mouth (1997) and Mo Harris in the BBC soap opera EastEnders.

Early life
Laila Morse was born Maureen Oldman on 1 August 1945. Her younger brother is actor and filmmaker Gary Oldman.

Career
At the age of 51, Morse made her professional acting debut in the 1997 film Nil by Mouth. The BAFTA winning film also marked the debut of her brother Gary, as a writer and director. Morse's performance as the matriarch won her the award of 'Most Promising Newcomer in any Category' at the British Independent Film Awards. 

Morse's television debut was in The Bill for two episodes, which was followed by a regular role as Honky Mum in the BBC sitcom Honky Sausages, and the character Molly in the 1999 television production of Great Expectations. In 2000, Morse played Laila in the film Love, Honour and Obey. 

In the same year, she made her first appearance as Mo Harris in the BBC soap opera  EastEnders. Her first scene in the BBC soap opera was with Pam St Clement, who played Pat Butcher. A couple of weeks later, a television critic said that Morse had acted like "a lump of cardboard". Recalling the article, Morse replied: "I daresay he was right! I was bloody petrified." She admitted that it was only three years later that she started to feel comfortable on set. Morse temporarily left EastEnders in January 2016, after appearing on a recurring basis since July 2012.
In June 2017, Morse expressed interest in returning to EastEnders as she felt that she never "officially left". In December 2017, it was announced that Morse would be returning to the show to play Mo. 

In 2011, Morse made a return to film when she appeared as Aunt Queenie in the film Big Fat Gypsy Gangster, written, produced and starring Ricky Grover. In December 2012, Morse made her pantomime debut as the Fairy in a production of Jack and the Beanstalk.

In January 2012, Morse took part in the seventh series of ITV celebrity edition skating show Dancing on Ice. 

Morse published her autobiography Just A Mo in 2013. In November 2013, Morse participated in the thirteenth series of I'm a Celebrity...Get Me Out of Here! and was the second participant to be voted out of the series on 2 December. 

In June 2016, it was announced that she would be taking part in the BBC series of Celebrity Masterchef. The series was won by Alexis Conran.

In 2019, Morse appeared as an BPRD employee in Hellboy. In 2021, it was announced that Morse was leaving EastEnders when her contract ended.

In 2021, Morse took part in the ITV series Strictly the Real Full Monty, where she was partnered with Homes Under the Hammer presenter Martin Roberts. Morse was praised by viewers when she revealed her breast cancer scars.

Personal life
Morse's stage name was suggested by the Italian actress Isabella Rossellini, who was dating Morse's brother, actor Gary Oldman. "Laila Morse" is an anagram of "mia sorella" which is Italian for "my sister". Morse was married to Gerald Bromfield from 1963 to 1970 and they had two children, Gerry and Tracy Bromfield.

Morse is a breast cancer survivor, having been diagnosed with the illness in May 2001 and recovered within a year. Morse revealed it had been Wendy Richard who had persuaded her to get a breast lump checked by doctors.

During the evening of 29 June 2008, Dano Sonnex and Nigel Farmer attempted to burgle her home, just hours before they committed the New Cross double murder.

In August 2013, Morse was declared bankrupt.

Filmography

Film

Television

 Television guest appearances
The Alan Titchmarsh Show (2008) – Guest
Come Dine with Me (2009) – Contestant
The Weakest Link (2010) – Contestant
Pointless Celebrities (2012) – Contestant
Sunday Side Up (29 December 2013) – Guest
The Chase: Celebrity Special (4 October 2014) – Contestant

Awards

See also
 List of Dancing on Ice contestants
 List of I'm a Celebrity...Get Me Out of Here! (British TV series) contestants

References

External links
 
 

1945 births
English soap opera actresses
English television actresses
English film actresses
Living people
Actresses from London
People from Bermondsey
English people of Irish descent
20th-century English actresses
21st-century English actresses
I'm a Celebrity...Get Me Out of Here! (British TV series) participants